Kaiser effect may refer to:
Kaiser effect (cosmology)
Kaiser effect (material science)